Aspidoscelis espiritensis, the Espiritu Santo whiptail, is a species of teiid lizard endemic to Isla Espíritu Santo in Mexico.

References

espiritensis
Reptiles described in 1921
Taxa named by John Van Denburgh
Taxa named by Joseph Richard Slevin
Reptiles of Mexico